Horsham Hospital is a health facility at Hurst Road in Horsham, West Sussex, England. It is managed by Sussex Community NHS Foundation Trust.

History
The facility, which was financed by voluntary donations, was completed in 1892. The hospital expanded into new purpose-built facilities slightly further east along Hurst Road in May 1923. A physiotherapy department, an outpatients department and a new maternity unit were all introduced during the Second World War. After the hospital joined the National Health Service in 1948, further additions included extra wards in 1981 and a new outpatients department in 1997. In June 2019 the trust began a consultation on closing a dementia ward at the hospital.

References

External links
Official site

Hospital buildings completed in 1892
1892 establishments in England
Hospitals in West Sussex
NHS hospitals in England
Horsham